Oakenholt is a village in Flintshire, Wales. It is situated to the south east of the town of Flint, near the A548 road. At the 2001 Census, the population of the Flint Oakenholt Ward was 2920.

In 2017 a major archaeological excavation began in the village to find evidence of any settlement during the Roman occupation of Britain.

References

External links 

Photos of Oakenholt and surrounding area on geograph.org.uk

Villages in Flintshire
Flint, Flintshire